The canton of Chartres-1 is an administrative division of the Eure-et-Loir department, northern France. It was created at the French canton reorganisation which came into effect in March 2015. Its seat is in Chartres.

It consists of the following communes:
 
Berchères-Saint-Germain
Briconville
Challet
Champhol
Chartres (partly)
Clévilliers
Coltainville
Fresnay-le-Gilmert
Gasville-Oisème
Jouy
Poisvilliers
Saint-Prest

References

Cantons of Eure-et-Loir